The Masonic Temple in Pendleton, Oregon is a historic building constructed in 1887. It was originally built as a meeting hall for Pendleton Lodge (a local Masonic lodge), with commercial space on the ground floor to help offset the cost of maintaining the meeting hall. It was listed on the listed on the National Register of Historic Places in 1982. Since its listing, the lodge had moved to a new building.

See also 
 National Register of Historic Places listings in Umatilla County, Oregon

References 

Clubhouses on the National Register of Historic Places in Oregon
Italianate architecture in Oregon
Masonic buildings completed in 1887
Buildings and structures in Pendleton, Oregon
Former Masonic buildings in Oregon
National Register of Historic Places in Umatilla County, Oregon
1887 establishments in Oregon
Historic district contributing properties in Oregon